

History and development 
  
In cooperation with AEG built MOWAG 37 aircraft tug named Flz Sch 4x2 for the Swiss Air Force. The vehicles were used primarily to move the Dassault Mirage IIIS and Mirage III RS in and out of the aircraft caverns. A special feature compared to other aircraft tugs (e.g. Bucher aircraft tractor) was that in these, the aircraft could be suspended during the journey of the towing hook to keep the time between leaving the cavern and the lift off of the Mirage short. 

The Mirage began immediately upon leaving the "Vorstollens" to start their engine. Once the engine was running, the latch was released by the tractor driver and he drove from the plane away and turned to the right, so the Mirage freely under its own power could roll on the taxiway  to the runway. 

The aircraft tractors were in use from 1967 to 2003 by the Swiss Air Force. One is  now part of the Military museum Full.

References 

Aircraft ground handling
Tractors
Military vehicles of Switzerland